The 2022–23 season is the 65th season in the club history of the handball branch of Zamalek SC, the season began with Egyptian Super Cup on the 10 September 2022, as Zamalek competes for the Egyptian Handball League, Egyptian Cup and African Handball Super Cup, Arab Handball Championship of Champions and African Handball Champions League.

Current squad

Staff 
Staff for the 2022–23 season.

Team 
Squad for the 2022–23 season.

Goalkeepers
 88  Karim Handawy
 72  Mahmoud Khalil
 12  Hesham El-Sobky
Left Wingers
 11  Ahmed Moamen Safa
 31  Omar Al-Wakil
3  Mazen Reda 
Right Wingers
 55  Hazem Mamdouh
1  Akram Yosri
Line Players
 25  Wisam Nawar
 24  Khalid Waleed
 77  Shady Khalil
4  Mohamed Ramadan
 41  Mohamed Tarek

Left Backs
 44  Mohamed Yassin
 10  Ali Hesham Nasr
 42  Hassan Walid
 23  James Parker
Central Backs
 20  Mohamed Alaa
8  Mohamed El-Bassiouny
Right Backs
 66  Ahmed El-Ahmar (C)
9  Mustafa Beshir
 18  Ahmed Hossam

Competitions

Overview

Egyptian Super Cup

Matches 
(Round 1)

(Round 2)

Arab Championship of Champions Club

Matches 

(Round 1)

(Round 2)

(Round 3)

(Quarter-Finals)

(Semi-Finals)

(Finals)

African Champions League

Matches 
(Round 1)

(Round 2)

(Round 3)

(Round 4)

(Quarter-Finals)

(Semi-Finals)

(Finals)

Egyptian League

First Stage 

Note First Team Got 8 Points From Team 2004, After Get the 3rd Place in the First Stage of the 2004 League.
Note First Team Got 8 Points From Team 2002, After Get the 3rd Place in the First Stage of the 2002 League.

Matches 

(Round 1)

(Round 2)

(Round 3)

(Round 4)

(Round 5)

(Round 6)

(Round 7)

(Round 8)

(Round 9)

(Round 10)

(Round 11)

(Round 12)

(Round 13)

(Round 14)

(Round 15)

(Round 16)

(Round 17)

Second Stage 

Note First Team Got Extra 4 Points After Winning on the Four Teams that Qualified for the Second Stage.
Note First Team Got 3 Points From Team 2004, After Get the 1st Place in the Second Stage of the 2004 League.

Matches 
(Round 1)

(Round 2)

(Round 3)

(Round 4)

(Round 5)

(Round 6)

(Round 7)

(Round 8)

(Round 9)

(Round 10)

Egyptian Cup 

(Round of 32)

(Round of 16)

(Quarter-finals)

Top Score

10 goals due to the withdrawal of the JSM Skikda team in the quarter-finals of the Arab Championship

References

Zamalek SC
Handball in Egypt
Zamalek SC seasons